The University of Mumbai is a collegiate, state-owned, public research university in Mumbai.

The University of Mumbai is one of the largest universities in the world. , the university had 711 affiliated colleges. Ratan Tata is the appointed head of the advisory council.

History
In accordance with "Wood's despatch", drafted by Sir Charles Wood in 1854, the University of Bombay was established in 1857 after the presentation of a petition from the Bombay Association to the British colonial government in India. The University of Mumbai was modelled on similar universities in the United Kingdom, specifically the University of London.

The first departments established were the Faculty of Arts at Elphinstone College in 1835 and the Faculty of Medicine at Grant Medical College in 1845. Both colleges existed before the university was founded and surrendered their degree-granting privileges to the university. The first degrees awarded in 1862 were Bachelor of Arts and Licentiate in Medicine. Medical schools such as Sindh Medical School in Hyderabad, Sindh were affiliated with the university as well.

Cornelia Sorabji, who later studied law at Somerville College becoming Oxford's first female law student and India's first female advocate, was the university's first female graduate in 1888.

Until 1904, the university only conducted examinations, awarded affiliations to colleges, developed curricula, and produced guidelines for colleges developing curricula. Teaching departments, research disciplines, and post-graduate courses were introduced from 1904, and several additional departments were established. After India achieved independence in 1947, the functions and powers of the university were reorganized under The Bombay University Act of 1953. The name of the university was changed from University of Bombay to University of Mumbai in 1996.

In 1949, student enrolment was 42,272 with 80 affiliated colleges. By 1975, these numbers had grown to 156,190 and 114 respectively.

Kalina Campus
Examination processes were made more efficient by the introduction of online delivery of question papers for examinations, and assessment of answer books by scanning at remote examination centres. The academic depository of the university was started in collaboration with CDSL in 2015. The university is the first university in the country to start an academic depository.

 Jawaharlal Nehru Library
 Alkesh Dinesh Mody Institute for Financial and Management Studies (ADMI) which offers BMS, MFSM, MS Finance &  MMS programmes

Library

Rajabai Clock Tower

One of Mumbai's landmarks, the Rajabai Clock Tower, was completed in the 1870s and houses the University of Mumbai's library. Sir George Gilbert Scott modeled the Rajabai Clock Tower on the clock tower of the Palace of Westminster in London. Local businessman Premchand Roychand contributed to the cost of construction and named the tower in memory of his mother, Rajabai. The tower clock is reported to have played 16 tunes including "Rule Britannia", "God Save the Queen", "Home! Sweet Home!" and "A Handel Symphony". On the initiative of the then Vice-Chancellor, Dr. Rajan Welukar, the first phase of restoration of Rajabai Clock Tower started in 2013 and was completed in May 2015. Tata Consultancy Services (TCS) gave a Rs 4 crore grant for this phase of the restoration project.

Convocation Hall

Affiliated colleges
Its jurisdiction extends over 7 districts -Mumbai City district, Mumbai Suburban district, Palghar,Raigad,Ratnagiri,Sindhudurg,Thane .

Prominent institutes
Several departments of the University of Mumbai are a part of vocational institutions and are not located on the four Mumbai campuses. These include the departments of Medicine and Medical Research located in many prominent hospitals in Mumbai, such as the Tata Memorial Hospital, Bombay Hospital and G.S. Medical College and King Edward Memorial Hospital. The Department of Medicine at Tata Memorial Hospital is now affiliated to the Homi Bhabha National Institute.

Institute of Chemical Technology (then known as the University Department of Chemical Technology, UDCT), was originally a department of MU, which later gained the status of a university.

Veermata Jijabai Technological Institute, then known as the Victorial Jubilee Technical Institute, founded in 1887, was the first Engineering Institute of the University of Mumbai. Thadomal Shahani Engineering College was the first Engineering college in the University of Mumbai to start courses in Computer Engineering, Information Technology, Electronics Engineering and Biomedical Engineering.

Libraries

Jawaharlal Nehru Library (JNL) is the central library, located on the campus at Kalina. As of May 2019, it desperately needs restoration.

Vice-Chancellors

 John Wilson – 1857
 Raymond West
 Alexander Kinloch Forbes
 Sir Alexander Grant, 10th Baronet – 1863–1868
 William Guyer Hunter – 1869
 Herbert Mills Birdwood
 Rev Dugald Mackichan – 1888-91
 Kashinath Trimbak Telang – 1892–1893
 Ramkrishna Gopal Bhandarkar – 1893–1894
 N. G. Chandavarkar – 1911−1912
 John Heaton – 1912–1915
 Pherozeshah Mehta – 1915
 Sir Leslie Orme Wilson (Chancellor) - 1927
 Mirza Akbar Khan – 1930–31
 R. P. Paranjpe – 1934
 Sir Rustom Pestonji Masani - 1941
 Pandurang Vaman Kane
 John Matthai – 1955–1957
 V. R. Khanolkar – 1960–1963
 Shashikant Karnik
 Trimbak Krishna Tope – 1971–1977
 M. D. Bengalee – 1986-1992
 Snehlata Deshmukh – 1995–2000
 Bhalchandra Mungekar – 2000–2005
 Vijay Khole – 2005 – September 2009
 Chandra Krishnamurthy – September 2009–July 2010, Acting Vice-Chancellor
 Suhas Pednekar - August 2010 - September 2010, Acting Vice-Chancellor
 Rajan Welukar – October 2010 – July 2015
 Sanjay V. Deshmukh – July 2015 – October 2017
 Suhas Pednekar - April 2018 − Present

Notable alumni

Rankings

Internationally, the University of Mumbai was ranked 1001–1200 in the QS World University Rankings of 2023 and 301–350 in Asia. It was ranked 1201–1500 in the world by the Times Higher Education World University Rankings of 2023, 351–400 in Asia in 2022 and in the same band among emerging economies.

The National Institutional Ranking Framework (NIRF) ranked it 65th among universities in India in 2020.

Partner universities
Memoranda of Understanding (MoUs) have been signed with University of Amsterdam, University of Bath, Liverpool Hope University, Toronto Metropolitan University, IESEG School of Management, Tianjin University of Technology, Tianjin University, Nankai University in China and Edith Cowan University in Australia.

See also
 List of universities in India
 Universities and colleges in India 
 Education in India

References

External links

 

 
Educational institutions established in 1857
Universities in Mumbai
1857 establishments in India
University of Mumbai alumni
Recipients of the Maulana Abul Kalam Azad Trophy